HMCS Chicoutimi was a  that served with the Royal Canadian Navy during the Second World War. She served primarily in the Battle of the Atlantic as an ocean escort. She was named for Chicoutimi, Quebec.

Background

Flower-class corvettes like Chicoutimi serving with the Royal Canadian Navy during the Second World War were different from earlier and more traditional sail-driven corvettes.  The "corvette" designation was created by the French as a class of small warships; the Royal Navy borrowed the term for a period but discontinued its use in 1877. During the hurried preparations for war in the late 1930s, Winston Churchill reactivated the corvette class, needing a name for smaller ships used in an escort capacity, in this case based on a whaling ship design. The generic name "flower" was used to designate the class of these ships, which – in the Royal Navy – were named after flowering plants.

Corvettes commissioned by the Royal Canadian Navy during the Second World War were named after communities for the most part, to better represent the people who took part in building them. This idea was put forth by Admiral Percy W. Nelles. Sponsors were commonly associated with the community for which the ship was named. Royal Navy corvettes were designed as open sea escorts, while Canadian corvettes were developed for coastal auxiliary roles which was exemplified by their minesweeping gear. Eventually the Canadian corvettes would be modified to allow them to perform better on the open seas.

Construction
Chicoutimi was ordered on 20 January 1940 as part of the 1939-1940 Flower-class building program. She was laid down 5 July 1940 by Canadian Vickers Ltd. at Montreal, Quebec and launched 16 October later that year. On 12 May 1941, Chicoutimi was commissioned at Montreal. She was one of the few Flower-class corvettes not to have her fo'c'sle extended.

War service
After arriving at Halifax on 17 May 1941, she was initially assigned to Sydney Force. In September 1941 she joined Newfoundland Escort Force as a mid-ocean escort. She served the next five months escorting convoys across the Atlantic.

In February 1942, Chicoutimi was reassigned to the Western Local Escort Force (WLEF). She served with WLEF until August 1944. Beginning in June 1943, she did so as part of escort group W-1.

In August 1944, Chicoutimi was sent to join  as a training ship. She remained so for the rest of the year and into early 1945. In April 1945, she rejoined Sydney Force and remained with that unit until the end of the war. She was paid off at Sorel, Quebec on 16 June 1945. The ship was sold in June 1946 and broken up at Hamilton.

References

External links

Flower-class corvettes of the Royal Canadian Navy
1940 ships